Trance Appeal is the sixth album by Klaus Schulze under the alias Richard Wahnfried (or just Wahnfried in this case), released in 1996.

Track listing
All tracks composed by Klaus Schulze and Jörg Schaaf, except where noted.

Personnel
Klaus Schulze – Electronics, keyboards
Jörg Schaaf – Computer programming, keyboards

References

1996 albums
Klaus Schulze albums